Petrol pump may refer to:

 fuel dispenser, a device at a filling station that dispenses fuel
 filling station, a facility that sells fuel and lubricants for motor vehicles